Suncheon station is a railway station in South Korea. It is on the Gyeongjeon Line and the Jeolla Line.

Railway stations in South Jeolla Province
Suncheon
Korea Train Express stations